Amanita pallidorosea is a mushroom of the large genus Amanita, which occurs under beech and pine in China and Japan. It is closely related to the destroying angel A. bisporiga.

See also

List of Amanita species
List of deadly fungi

References

pallidorosea
Poisonous fungi
Deadly fungi
Fungi of Asia
Fungi of China
Fungi described in 2010